Shepton Montague Railway Cutting is a 1.61 hectare geological Site of Special Scientific Interest at Shepton Montague in Somerset, notified in 1992.

It, which was part of the Somerset and Dorset Joint Railway, the section of Fuller's Earth Rock (Middle Jurassic) in England. The succession ranges from the upper part of the Lower Fuller's Earth Clay up to the Rugitela Beds.

References

External links
 English Nature website (SSSI information)

Sites of Special Scientific Interest in Somerset
Sites of Special Scientific Interest notified in 1992
Railway cuttings in the United Kingdom
Rail transport in Somerset
Geology of Somerset